Más Negro que la Noche  (Blacker Than Night)  is a 1975 Mexican supernatural horror film, written and directed by Carlos Enrique Taboada.

Plot 
The film is about four women that move to a creepy house, inherited by one of them from an old aunt; as a condition, they must take care of the aunt's pet, a black cat. One day they find the cat dead. Soon after, Aurora's dead body is found hanging in the library by Ofelia. One night, a half drunken Pilar comes to the house. As she is walking to the steps she sees the ghost of Susana and falls to her death on the floor. Now Ofelia and Marta are the only ones left in the house. Marta tells Ofelia that Aurora had killed the cat along with her and Pilar, and that she knows that she is next. Ofelia tells her to get away from the house and she runs to open the gate for her boyfriend. They find Marta impaled with several knitting needles. As a sobbing Ofelia and her boyfriend are leaving the house, the cat's meowing is heard in house.

Cast 
 Claudia Islas - Ofelia
 Susana Dosamantes - Aurora
 Lucía Méndez - Marta
 Helena Rojo - Pilar
 Julián Pastor - Pedro
 Alicia Palacios - Sofia
 Pedro Armendáriz Jr. - Roberto
  - Tia Susana

Release 
The film premiered on December 25, 1975 in Mexico and was released in the late 1970s as Blacker Than the Night.

Remake 
In 2014, Henry Bedwell directed a remake of the film, this time with an English release title of Darker Than Night.

Notes

External links 
 

1975 films
1975 horror films
Mexican supernatural horror films
Films directed by Carlos Enrique Taboada
Films set in country houses
1970s Mexican films
1970s slasher films